Borków may refer to the following places in Poland:
Borków, Lower Silesian Voivodeship (south-west Poland)
Borków, Lublin Voivodeship (east Poland)
Borków, Kielce County in Świętokrzyskie Voivodeship (south-central Poland)
Borków, Opatów County in Świętokrzyskie Voivodeship (south-central Poland)
Borków, Pińczów County in Świętokrzyskie Voivodeship (south-central Poland)
Borków, Masovian Voivodeship (east-central Poland)

Borkow (without the accent mark) was also the old German name for what is now Borek, in Gorzów County, Lubusz Voivodeship (western Poland)